Bradie Tennell (born January 31, 1998) is an American figure skater. She is a 2018 Olympic team event bronze medalist, the 2020 Four Continents bronze medalist, the 2018 CS Autumn Classic champion, the 2018 CS Golden Spin of Zagreb champion, and a two-time U.S. national champion (2018, 2021).

Tennell began skating when she was two years old, even though she learned to walk late and had to wear orthotics in her shoes to correct a pronation problem in her feet. Her first rink was in Crystal Lake, Illinois. She began working with coach Denise Myers when she was nine, up until August 2020. Tennell won her first competition at age ten as a juvenile and rose up the ranks, becoming a senior-level skater in November 2016. She spent the 2015–2016 and 2016–2017 seasons recovering from a back injury but came back in 2017, winning the gold medal at the 2018 U.S. Nationals and competing at the 2018 Olympics.

As of March 2021, Tennell was the fifth-highest ranked women's singles skater in the world by the International Skating Union.

Personal life
Bradie Tennell was born on January 31, 1998, in Winfield, Illinois. Her mother, Jean Tennell, was a registered nurse and single mother. Her two younger brothers were hockey players. At one point, Tennell, her mother, and brothers lived in a one-bedroom, one-bath apartment; Jean Tennell, worked overnight shifts at two hospitals while transporting her daughter to the skating rink. In 2018, Bradie Tennell described to a reporter the financial hardships her family went through to support her skating career.

Tennell began skating when she was two years old and had to wear orthotics in her shoes to correct a pronation of the hip problem. She told reporters that she was not sure how she got into figure skating, although she remembered begging her mother to take her to the ice rink. Her first rink was in Crystal Lake, Illinois, not far from her home in Carpentersville, Illinois. Tennell and her brothers were home-schooled as well as took online courses. When Tennell was seven years old, she drew a picture of herself atop an Olympic podium, flanked by her role models Michelle Kwan and Kristi Yamaguchi. When Tennell was ten, she began working with Denise Myers. Tennell skated most of her life at a rink in Buffalo Grove, Illinois, where she also gave lessons to young skaters before beginning her own training, even after competing nationally. In 2018, she was taking courses at a local community college, to prepare for a possible career in the health field.

Career

Early career
Tennell won her first competition when she was ten years old. In 2010, at the age of 12, she came in first place at the Upper Great Lakes Regionals, which qualified her to compete as a juvenile at the 2010 U.S. Junior Nationals, where she came in 10th place. Her goals for the following season was to perfect her double axel and return to junior Nationals. In 2011, she came in third place in the intermediate division at the Upper Great Lakes Regionals and 15th place at the U.S. Junior Championships, again as an intermediate. In 2012, as a novice, she came in third place at both the Midwestern Sectionals and 2012 Upper Great Lakes Regionals. She competed, also as a novice, at the 2012 U.S. Championships in San Jose, California, where she came in tenth place overall, after earning 32.60 points and coming in tenth place in her short program and 68.78 points in her free skate. She later told a reporter that she almost got lost getting to the event, and began her short program on the wrong side of the rink because it was the first time she skated in a big stadium and there were no lines or hockey circles on the ice like the on rinks she was familiar with.

Tennell came in second place overall as a novice at the 2013 Midwestern Sectionals, coming in first place after the short program with 46.05 points and coming in fourth place after the free skate with 72.95 points. She won the gold medal at the Upper Great Lakes Regionals, also as a novice. She won the bronze medal, her first "notable medal", at the 2013 U.S. Nationals, again in the novice division, even though she had only two triples in her free skate. She opened her program with a triple Salchow but fell while attempting a triple toe loop. She successfully executed three triple jumps, coming in fourth place in the free skate and earning 116.91 points overall. Tennell came in second place at the 2014 Midwestern Sectionals as a junior. She came in fourth place at the 2014 U.S. Nationals and second place at the Gardena Spring Trophy, again as a junior.

2014–2015 season
Tennell began the 2014–2015 season by competing at the Nagoya TV Cup in Japan; she came in eighth place, coming in fourth place in the short program, eighth place in the free skate, and earning 144.89 points overall. She also came in second place at the 2015 Midwestern Sectionals. At the 2015 U.S. Championships, in what NBC Sports called her "breakout moment", and in what reporter Jeré Longman called her "career advancement", she won the gold medal as a junior "by blowing away the field" with a "near-perfect" free skate, earning 16 points more than the second-place finisher. Tennell later said that although she was well-trained, she went into the competition not expecting to win. She also considered her win at Nationals the first step to competing in the 2018 Winter Olympics; as figure skating reporter Philip Hersh stated, "Both the 2012 junior champion, Gracie Gold, and the 2013 junior champion, Polina Edmunds, had made the 2014 U.S. Olympic team, so a similar progression for Tennell seemed realistic". Three months after Nationals, Tennell fractured both wings of a lumbar vertebra and had to spend the summer of 2015 in a back brace.

2015–2016 season
Tennell began the 2015–2016 season by coming in 11th place at the Junior Grand Prix Cup of Austria; she came in ninth place in the short program and 13th place in the free skate, earning a total of 124.54 points. She won both her sectional and regional competitions, which qualified her for the 2016 U.S. Championships. She came in sixth place at her senior debut at the U.S. Nationals, earning a spot at the World Junior championships, where she came in 11th place overall, after falling three times during her free skate. At Worlds, she came in fourth place in the short program and 14th place in the free skate, earning 147.52 points overall. In June 2016, Tennell had the same back injury as the year before, but to a different vertebra.

2016–2017 season

Tennell was again in a back brace and off the ice for three months in the summer of 2016 while undergoing intense physical therapy. She was not able to return to the ice until early September 2016. Reporter Sean Jacobs called this period "dark days" for Tennell; she said that wearing a back brace was "very tough", and that her mother helped her not give up and to "put things in perspective". She redoubled her off-ice recovery efforts, attempting fewer jumps and taking more physical therapy and Pilates to lessen the chance of future back injuries and so that she could come back for the 2016–2017 season. She competed, but the season, along with the 2015–2016 season, "were largely lost", because she was not able to train properly. She later told Time magazine that not being able to skate for months at a time was "not very pleasant or fun for me". She also said that the experience reinforced her love for figure skating and gave her a renewed sense of motivation. Her coach Denise Myers praised Tennell for her tenacity, later saying, "Even when she was injured, it wasn't a matter of if she was coming back, it was a matter of when she was coming back".

Tennell struggled throughout the season; 48 other skaters had higher season's-best scores than her, including seven from the U.S., and she earned 14 points less than the next-highest scoring female American skater. She missed six months of competition over two years, but made her senior international debut in November 2016, at the 2016 Tallinn Trophy, where she came in third place. She had four months to prepare for the 2017 U.S. Championships and came in a "disappointing" ninth place. At the 2017 World Junior Championships, she came in seventh place in both her short program and free skate, coming in seventh place overall and earning a total of 161.36 points.

2017–2018 season
Tennell went into the 2017–2018 season working on improving her component scores and artistry. It was the first time she was injury free since the 2014–2015 season. Reporter Nick Patterson called the season "the stuff of childhood fantasies" for Tennell. She began the season as a relative unknown, even within the U.S., but ended the year as a U.S. champion, an Olympic medalist, and "one of the biggest names in American skating". Reporter Philip Hersh called her success "a flight of fancy". Chelsea Janes of the Washington Post said that Tennell overcame her previous injuries and "the inconsistency that so often follows them". Competing at the 2018 Olympics was a goal, although Tennell told reporters throughout the season that she preferred to focus on one competition at a time because thinking about making the U.S. team could be overwhelming for her.

The music to Tennell's short program, choreographed by Scott Brown, was selections from the popular Korean film Taegukgi, a piece of music that was well-known and beloved in Korea. Tennell said that she "fell in love with how powerful" the piece was after a friend recommended it to her. Her coach called the music "a conscious choice", since the 2018 Olympics were in Korea. Her free skate, set to the "Cinderella" soundtrack, was choreographed by Benoit Richard. Hersh, however, called Tennell's programs "choreographically callow".

Tennell's first event of the season was the 2017 Philadelphia Summer International in early August 2017; she came in first place with a successful triple Lutz-triple toe in both of her programs, which earned her an invitation to Skate America. She came in second place in both the short program and the free skate in Philadelphia and earned 184.98 points overall. Tennell came in fourth place overall at the 2017 Lombardia Trophy, with 196.70 points, coming in fifth place in the short program, third place in the free skate, and beating 2014 Olympic bronze medalist Carolina Kostner of Italy and 2015 world champion Elizaveta Tuktamysheva of Russia.

Going into the 2017 Skate America, her first Grand Prix event as a senior skater, Tennell was "little more than an afterthought" in international figure skating. She competed against three-time U.S. national champion Ashley Wagner and former World Championship medalists Gabrielle Daleman of Canada, Satoko Miyahara of Japan, and Alena Leonova of Russia. She performed two "flawless routines" and came in third place overall; she and Wagner were the only two American women to win Grand Prix medals (both bronze) during the season. Her short program score, 67.01 points, was a personal best.

Tennell "shone" in her free skate, skating a clean program and successfully executing seven triple jumps (four in combination), and earning Level 4 marks for her spins. She earned 137.09 points, also a new personal best. She earned 204.10 points overall, the highest international score by an American woman since Wagner earned 215.39 points at the 2016 World Championships. She was the first U.S. female single skater to win a medal at her first Grand Prix for ten years, since Caroline Zhang in 2007. Tennell's win at Skate America also put her into contention for the U.S. Olympic team, but when she was asked about the possibility that she could compete at the Olympics, her coach Denise Myers said that Tennell had not yet reached her peak. Myers also said that Tennell did so well because she had successfully overcome her past injuries and that when she was healthy, she tended to excel. Tennell was pleased with her performances at Skate America but went home with the goal of working on fine-tuning both her programs for Nationals, including earning Level 4 scores on both step sequences.

At the U.S. Championships, Tennell skated "two more flawless routines" largely due to her jumping and technical abilities, which helped her earn the maximum number of technical points. Reporter Chelsea Janes called Tennell's short program "an unexpected coronation" for Tennell and made her "a legitimate contender" for the U.S. Olympic team. She was in first place after the short program, with Mirai Nagasu seven-tenths of a point behind her in second place, Karen Chen in third place, and Wagner in fifth place. Tennell received a standing ovation from the audience with her "masterfully executed jumps and aggressive, tight spins". Her step sequences were aggressive and effective but less polished than Wagner's. Tennell earned 73.79 points during her short program, the highest-scoring women's short program at U.S. Nationals up to that point.

Janes, about Tennell's free skate, said that Tennell was "peaking at just the right moment" and that she "showcased to perfection", although Janes felt that Tennell needed "more polish in the nuanced aspects of performance-based scores". Jeré Longman of the New York Times, who called Tennell "a most improbable American champion" and "self-possessed and unexcitable", also called Tennell's free skate "a composed, nearly flawless performance as Cinderella". She executed her triple Lutz-triple toe loop combination "with metronomic precision". She came in first place after her free skate by almost five points with a career-best score of 219.51 points, again beating Nagusu, who came in second place in the free skate. Longman, who reported that Tennell had successfully completed every triple jump she had attempted for three competitions, also said that she handled the pressure of possibly qualifying for the Olympics with no outward sign of nervousness. Tennell won her first Nationals gold medal; Nagusu won the silver medal, and Chen won the bronze medal. All three were named to the U.S. Olympics team. According to reporter Philip Hersh, Tennell was chosen because whereas she had excelled all season, her competitors had not. She was also able to make up for her struggles the previous season. Reporter Christine Brennan called choosing Tennell instead of Wagner, a more well-known, established, and experienced skater despite her fourth-place finish at Nationals, "a gamble" for U.S. Figure Skating. The 2018 Games were Tennell's first Olympics. United Airlines paid for her mother and two brothers to travel to PyeongChang to watch her compete, after the company discovered that the family had set up a GoFundMe page to raise money for the trip. She came into the Olympics as a "long shot", although Gary D'Amato of the Milwaukee Journal Sentinel called Tennell "the dark horse" of the Olympics.

Tennell skated a clean and error-free short program for the team competition. She had the support of the Korean audience due to the Korean piece of music she used. She successfully completed her first and hardest jump combination, a triple Lutz-triple toe loop, as well as every other jump in her program. She continued her consistency with her "textbook technique and reliability in landing jumps". She received lower scores for her choreography, skating skills, and transitions compared to more experienced skaters like Katelyn Osmond from Canada and Carolina Kostner from Italy. She came in fifth place out of ten competitors, earning 68.94 points and helping the U.S. win a bronze medal in the team event. Tennell said that she was happy with her performance: "I don't think I could have asked for a better first program at the Olympics".

In the individual event, Tennell was placed in the first warm-up group based on her world ranking; out of 30 competitors, she was first to skate the short program. Despite completing every jump during practice, she fell for the first time all season during the short program, 30 seconds into the program. She was able to hold onto a poor landing on the opening jump of her combination, the triple Lutz, but fell on the second jump, the triple toe loop. Tennell said later that she could not remember the last time she fell; she was the only skater at the Olympics who had not had a fall in previous competitions, and she had not fallen in the previous 34 jumping passes competed in four competitions earlier in the season. She recovered and skated the rest of her program cleanly, including a triple loop and double Axel, and remained in first place for over two hours. She came in 11th place after the short program and earned 64.01 points. Tennell rebounded with a strong free skate, coming in ninth place. She came in ninth place overall, with 192.35 points, the highest placement among her American teammates. After her performances, Tennell received a call from Peggy Fleming, and Scott Hamilton praised her for her mental toughness. Tara Lipinski called her "a machine" and said that she had "nerves of steel".

When Tennell returned home, she began training for the 2018 World Championships immediately. She appeared, for the first time, in a parade in East Dundee, Illinois, near her hometown of Carpentersville. Tennell, along with teammates Nagasu and Mariah Bell, had "solid performances" at Worlds, although they earned only two slots in the 2019 Worlds for the U.S. women. She finished in sixth place overall, the highest placement among the American women. She skated a clean short program, coming in seventh place, with 68.76 points, almost 12 points behind Carolina Kostner of Italy, who earned a personal-best score of 80.27 points. Tennell had the fourth-highest score in the free skate. She ended the season with "a full and physically demanding" tour with Stars on Ice.

2018–2019 season

Tennell started the 2018–2019 season by attending U.S. Figure Skating's Champs Camp, a training camp for elite skaters, in August 2018; she said while there: "I want to be a whole new skater, unrecognizable from last season". She also worked on being more expressive, less shy, and allowing her personality to come through in her skating. Her choreographer Benoit Richaud said that as of 2018, she was "still under construction" and that she needed to build upon her technical abilities. Her programs were more challenging, with fewer and more difficult transitions. She also added a triple Lutz-triple loop combination in both her short program and free skate and a triple Lutz-triple toe in her free skate and worked to improve her edges on her triple flip. Reporter Karen Rosen stated that Tennell competed "with an intensity" missing from the previous season.

In her short program, Tennell chose music from the 2014 film Lucy, a song called "Rebirth" performed by Hi-Finnesse and Egyptian-British singer Natacha Atlas. Reporter Lynn Rutherford called it "a fiercely driving program that requires Tennell to skate full-throttle for most of the routine". For her free skate, which Richaud also choreographed, she used music from three versions of Romeo and Juliet, done to make the program modern and to emphasize Tennell's strength, speed, and emotion. The first section included selections from Prokofiev's ballet and used angular, powerful movements to show Juliet's determination and willfulness; the middle section featured the score from the 1968 film and was highlighted by a fluid step sequence. The third section of the program featured the score from the 1996 movie Romeo + Juliet. Tennell's coach Denise Myers thought that her free skate showed a more mature side to Tennell. Richaud also stated that the 2018–2019 season was the first year he and Tennell worked "as true collaborators", and that he looked forward to continuing to work with her leading up to the 2022 Olympics.

Tennell's first competition of the season was the Autumn Classic International in Oakville, Ontario. NBC Sports reported that she "scored a big upset" over two-time world champion and Olympic silver medalist Evgenia Medvedeva of Russia; it was Tennell's first senior international title. She came in second place after the short program, just 1.72 points behind Medvedeva. She had a difficult warm-up before the free skate but was happy with her performance so early in the season. NBC Sports also reported that she was more expressive and elegant than the previous season, "with angular movements and staccato footwork". Reporter Karen Price said that she "put on a display of power, grace and her trademark clean routine" that showcased her technical prowess and tenacity. Tennell successfully completed seven solid triples, including two triple-triple combinations, although the judges ruled two jumps short of rotation. One of the combinations was a triple Lutz-triple loop, which only one other skater, Olympic champion Alina Zagitova, had done the previous season. She also completed intricate footwork and transitions, ending with "a beautiful spinning sequence". She earned a personal free skate best score of 137.15 points, and 206.41 points overall. Figure skating analyst Tara Lipinski stated that although Tennell was not yet at the same level as Medvedeva or Zagitova, her performance at the Autumn Classic demonstrated a strong start to the season, as well as a dramatic improvement in her music choices, choreography, and intention behind each movement.

Tennell was "one of the headliners" going into the 2018 Skate America. She "displayed great tempo and flow" in the short program, but she popped the second jump in her planned triple Lutz-triple loop combination into a single jump, ending up with a score of 61.72 and in fifth place. Her free skate was "underwhelming", with three minor errors, and she came in fourth place overall. U.S. champion and Olympic silver medalist Rosalynn Sumners, who watched Tennell's free skate at Skate America, later stated that she was impressed with Tennell's growth in her maturity and strength since the previous season and that her free skating program, which she called a " professional, polished program", was fun to watch.

In order to qualify for the Grand Prix Final, Tennell would have had to win her next Grand Prix assignment, 2018 Internationaux de France. Her free skate included five triple jumps, but she underrotated the second jump of her triple Lutz-triple loop combination and the first jump of her triple flip-double toe-double loop combination. She earned high scores on her Level 4 spins and footwork, coming in second place in the free skate, with 136.44 points overall, and third place overall, with 197.78 points. Tennell came in first place at 2018 CS Golden Spin in both the short program and free skate, and after earning 202.41 points, came in first place overall. She later told a reporter that she was disappointed with her artistic performance, calling it "lackluster" and expressing her intention to work on improving it before the U.S. Championships.

At Nationals in Detroit, Tennell came in first place after her "sharp, clean" short program, earning 76.60 points, the best all-time women's short program score at U.S. Nationals, beating the previous score of 73.79 points, a record she had made a year earlier. She opened her program with a "breathtaking" triple Lutz-triple toe loop combination and successfully executed a double Axel but got an edge call on her triple flip. She earned high-scoring Level 4s on all her elements and went into the free skate as the favorite to win her second U.S. Nationals in a row.

Tennell came in second place overall, behind Alysa Liu, who, at her debut on the senior level, became the youngest U.S. women's champion in history. During the free skate, Tennell stepped out of the second jump of her triple Lutz-triple loop combination and fell on an underrotated triple Lutz, missing the second jump in a planned combination. She completed Level 4 spins and footwork, all with high marks, throughout her program and earned the second-highest component score of the competition. She came in fourth place after the free skate, earning 136.99 points and 213.59 points overall. Tennell, third-pace finisher Mariah Bell, and Ting Cui, who came in fifth place, were chosen to compete at the Four Continents Championships because Liu was not age-eligible to compete internationally. Tennell and Bell were chosen to compete at the Worlds championships.

At Four Continents, Tennell held a slight lead after the short program by half a point over Kaori Sakamoto of Japan. She skated a "strong and fluid" program, successfully completing a triple Lutz-triple toe in the opening moments of the program, a double Axel, and her final jump, a triple flip. She earned high-scoring Level 4s on all her elements, earning a season's best of 73.91 points. Reporter Helene Elliott said that Tennell's short program "featured a new and welcome sense she was emotionally engaged, which complemented her proficiency." Elliott also reported that Sakamoto had slightly better program component scores, while Tennell had slightly better technical element scores. During her free skate, Tennell underrotated four triple jumps, was only able to complete two solid triple jumps successfully, and turned her triple loop into a single jump. She was also, like at U.S. Nationals, unable to complete her triple Lutz-triple loop combination. She earned Level 4s on all her spins and footwork but came in fifth place after the free skate and fifth place overall. She later expressed frustration that the only time she failed to complete her Lutz-loop combination was during competitions and told a reporter that she was considering removing it before Worlds.

At Worlds in Saitama, Japan, Tennell came in tenth place after a "disappointing" short program, earning 69.50 points. She successfully completed an Axel and triple flip but underrotated the last jump in her triple Lutz-triple toe combination, even though she had performed it consistently in practice. She successfully completed seven triple jumps during her free skate, including a double Axel and a triple Lutz-triple toe combination jump early in her program, earning a season's best score of 143.97 points and coming in seventh place overall, with 213.47 points. Tennell told reporters that she was happy with her free skate, which was called "one of the best skates of her career", and that her confidence had improved since Four Continents after wavering earlier in the season. The American women were unable to secure three slots for the 2020 Worlds Championships since, with Tennell's seventh-place finish and teammate Mariah Bell's ninth-place finish, they were unable to earn the required combined placements of at least 13th place.

Tennell ended the season competing for the U.S. at the 2019 World Team Trophy, helping her team win the competition for the fourth time since it started in 2009. She came in fourth place after the short program, earning 74.81 points . As figure skating reporter Philip Hersh said, she performed the best free skating program of her career, with seven triple jumps, including a successful triple Lutz-triple toe combination and a double Axel-triple toe combination in the second half of the program. She scored 150.83 points, a new U.S. record, and came in second place, more than three points under Elizaveta Tuktamysheva from Russia, who came in first in the free skate. She and Bell, who also competed for the U.S. in the women's portion, contributed a total of 17 points towards their team's combined score of 117 points, beating Japan and Russia.

2019–2020 season 

Tennell worked with Alexei Mishin in Courchevel in the French Alps during the summer of 2019; she worked on her choreography, body movements, gestures, and artistry, which, according to figure skating reporter Jean-Christophe Berlot, "deeply modified her style on the ice" throughout the season, especially her two appearances during the Grand Prix and the Grand Prix Final. She also worked on including a triple Axel into her routines, which was ready at the beginning of the season, but a stress fracture in her foot in July 2019 prevented her from using it. Benoit Richaud, who choreographed her programs again for the 2019–2020 season, predicted that Tennell would be proficient in the jump by the following season and the 2022 Olympics. Tennell's short program music included "a fast-paced medley of [Russian musician] Kirill Richter's staccato piano compositions", which demonstrated a lighter, more "fun-loving" side of her personality. It was again choreographed by Richaud and was a replacement for a short program he choreographed early in the season, which failed to inspire Tennell. Her free skating program, also choreographed by Richaud, was set to music from the 1988 film Cinema Paradiso. Her coach Denise Myers called Tennell's short program "a little sassier, a little more mature", and her free skate "soft and feminine". There was also no choreographed break before her step sequence, unlike her previous free skating program, so it was more challenging.

Tennell "had a rough start after her injury", but attended U.S. Figure Skating's Champ Camp in early August, although she had to wear a protective boot. She had to withdraw from a Challenger Series competition early in the season due to the injury but returned to training one month before her first competition of the season, 2019 Skate America. She placed first place in her "flawless" short program, with a personal best score of 75.10 points, an almost two-point advantage over Japanese skaters Kaori Sakamoto and Wakaba Higuchi, who were in second and third place, and Anna Shcherbakova from Russia, who was in fourth place, going into the free skate. Tennell's jumps were "effortless" and included "a solid" triple Lutz-triple toe loop combination, a double Axel, and triple flip. Her spins and footwork all received Level 4s, and she received a standing ovation from the spectators. Tennell skated a clean free skate as well, scoring 141.04 points. She successfully completed six triple jumps, including opening with her most difficult element, a triple Lutz-triple toe loop combination, as well as a triple flip-double toe-double loop combination and another triple Lutz-triple toe combination during the second half of the program. The technical judging panel, however, identified the second triple Lutz-triple toe combination as a triple-double, which removed several points from her score. A misidentification of an element did not qualify for an appeal in ISU rules, so Tennell's score remained, although it had no impact on the outcome of the competition. She earned 150.83 points during the free skate and the highest program component score of the competition. Tennell came in second place overall, earning a total of 216.14 points and her first silver medal at a Grand Prix competition.

Tennell placed fourth at Skate Canada, a week after Skate America, earning a total of 211.31 points overall. She skated two "fairly clean" programs, and was the highest-scoring competitor without a quadruple jump. She came in fourth place after the short program, earning 72.92 points overall. She also was given Level 4 marks for three elements and earned the second-highest program component score (34.46 points). During her free skate, Tennell underrotated the second jump in a triple Lutz-triple toe combination and stepped out of a triple flip, but she was able to successfully complete a triple Lutz-triple toe combination at the beginning of the program, as well as two double Axels and a triple Salchow. Her spins and footwork were given Level 4s. She came in fifth place in the free skate but earned the third-highest program component score of the competition, with 138.39 points.

Tennell was the only American woman to compete at the 2019 Grand Prix Final, the first American woman since Ashley Wagner and Gracie Gold in 2015 and the first Grand Prix Final of her career. She came in "a creditable fifth place", ahead of World champion Alina Zagitova. Her choreography and movement had improved in both her short program and free skate. Other than underrotating the final jump in her triple Lutz-triple toe combination in the short program, she skated a clean program. She also successfully completed a double Axel and triple flip, as well as earning Level 4s and positive grades of execution in her spins and footwork. She came in fourth place after the short program, with 72.20 points, three points below her personal best score. She successfully completed a triple Lutz-triple toe and triple Salchow in her "beautiful" free skate, although she underrotated the final jump in her second triple Lutz-triple toe combination later in the program. She also underrotated the triple flip portion of her three-jump combination, which included a double toe jump and double loop. She also earned positive grades of execution for her "solid" double Axels, spins, and footwork. She earned 139.98 points, less than two points below her season's best, and 212.18 points overall.

At the 2020 U.S. Nationals, Tennell required treatment for an infected hematoma in her arm, injured a few months earlier when she hit a wall during a fall. Despite not being able to bend her arm the previous morning, Tennell came in first place in the short program over defending champion Alysa Liu, and Mariah Bell. Reporter Paula Slater called Tennell's short program "a stellar performance". She opened with a "solid" triple Lutz-double Axel combination, and successfully completed a triple flip and executed strong Level 4 spins and footwork. She earned 78.96 points, over 3.5 points more than Liu and the highest-ever short program score at Nationals. In her free skate, Tennell started off strongly with two triple Lutz-triple toe combinations, but underrotated the first jump in her triple flip-double toe combination and fell on her triple loop. She earned Level 4s for all her elements and received the second-highest component scores. She finished third in the free skate, with 141.90 points, and came in third place overall, with 220.86 points. She later said that competing at Nationals was more challenging than competing at the Grand Prix Finals.

Tennell came in third place at the 2020 Four Continents Championships. She "showed intensity" during her short program, successfully executing a solid triple Lutz-triple toe combination, double Axel, and triple flip. She earned a Level 3 on her final combination spin and Level 4s on all her other elements, coming in second place with 75.93 points, a season's best score, and five points behind Japanese skater Rika Kihira. Reporter Paula Slater called Tennell's free skate "a confident and expressive routine", although she turned out her landing of the first jump of her triple Lutz-triple toe combination and received an edge call on the triple flip portion of her triple flip-double toe-double loop combination. She successfully completed four clean triple jumps and two double Axels and earned Level 4 spins and footwork. She earned 147.04 points, a season's-best score, and 222.97 points overall.

Tennell and Mariah Bell were chosen to represent the U.S. women at the 2020 World Championships. It would have been her third consecutive trip to Worlds, but the competition was canceled due to the COVID-19 outbreak.

2020–2021 season 
In August 2020, Tennell announced that she was changing coaches from her long-time coach Denise Myers to Tom Zakrajsek. Tennell moved to Colorado Springs, Colorado, where Zakrajsek is based, to train with him. Tennell and Zakrajsek began working on adding a triple Axel and a few quadruple jumps to her repertoire.

Tennell came in second place at Skate America, after Mariah Bell, who won the gold medal. She won the U.S. Nationals in 2021 for the second time, three years after winning her first title. Tennell and Karen Chen, who came in third place, were chosen to represent the U.S. women at the 2021 World Championships. Tennell placed seventh in the short program and eight in the free skate, ending up in the ninth place overall. Tennell's placement along with Chen's fourth secured two berths for the United States at the 2022 Winter Olympics, with the possibility of a third, and three places at the following year's world championships.

Subsequently, Tennell was named to the American team for the 2021 World Team Trophy.

2021–2022 season 

Tennell withdrew from what was scheduled to be her first Grand Prix assignment of the season, the 2021 Skate America, due to a foot injury. She also withdrew from 2021 Gran Premio d'Italia (the replacement event for 2021 Cup of China) and 2021 CS Cup of Austria. On December 28, 2021, Tennell announced on social media that she was withdrawing from the 2022 U.S. Championships, due to the same foot injury that had plagued her all season, making her ineligible to compete in the Olympics unless she filed a petition for a place on the U.S team. Her withdrawal made her the first American woman not to defend her national title since Sasha Cohen in 2007 and the first not to do so during an Olympic year since Michelle Kwan in 2006. Kwan was the last American figure skater to successfully petition for a place on an Olympic team after not competing at a national championship.

2022–2023 season 
After waiting several months to allow her foot to heal, Tennell traveled to France in July to visit with choreographer Benoit Richaud in La Garde. Her time there prompted her to decide to switch to training with Richaud and technical coach Cedric Tour in Nice full-time. Describing her rationale for the move, she said, "it was really just being able to experience something new in the sport as far as training methods and technique. For me, it wasn't necessarily about learning something new but more about looking at things in a different way. That really intrigued me because, at this stage in my career."

Tennell had initially planned to begin her season at the Japan Open as part of the American team, but a new ankle injury prompted her to withdraw from that event, as well as from the International Cup of Nice. Instead, she first participated in the Grand Prix at the 2022 MK John Wilson Trophy in Sheffield. She fell twice in the short program, finishing tenth of twelve skaters in that segment. She dropped to twelfth place after the free skate. Tennell then finished eighth at the 2022 Grand Prix of Espoo. Following the Grand Prix, Tennell was given a Challenger assignment to the 2022 CS Golden Spin of Zagreb, where she won the short program. She was overtaken in the free skate by fellow American Lindsay Thorngren, winning the silver medal.

At the 2023 U.S. Championships, Tennell placed narrowly second in the short program, only 0.02 points behind title favourite Isabeau Levito after making a spin error. Speaking afterward she said "this was a very long time in the making. I definitely had my fair share of bumps in the road on the way here but overall, I am really happy with my performance." She was second in the free skate as well, albeit ten points behind Levito and having made jump errors, and won the silver medal.

Assigned to compete at the 2023 Four Continents Championships on home ice in Colorado Springs, Tennell finished fifth in the short program after underrotating part of her jump combination. She was sixth in the free skate, and dropped to sixth overall. Tennell revealed afterward that she had been sick during the preceding week and felt "like a frog" on the day, but that she was "proud" about having maintained control.

Skating technique 
Tennell was known for her consistency, jumping proficiency, resiliency, and mental toughness. Reporter Gary D'Amato stated that Tennell's strengths were her athleticism and her consistency in completing difficult jumps. Chelsea Janes of the Washington Post agreed, stating that "Tennell's gift is her jumping ability". Janes compared Tennell with fellow American skater Mirai Nagasu, stating that although she did not have Nagasu's "explosive aerial capabilities", Tennell was one of the most consistent American skaters in her jumps. She rarely fell in competition, which helped her earn high technical element scores; she credited it to the technique her first coach, Denise Myers, taught her. Myers, who praised Tennell for her patience and perseverance, said that she was "amazed" with Tennell's consistency, although she tended to not score as high in her component scores. Tennell also credited her mother's "all-encompassing support" for her success.

Figure skater and commentator Scott Hamilton stated that Tennell was "as unflappable" as Olympic athletes Alina Zagitova and Evgenia Medvedeva from Russia. Figure skater and commentator Tara Lipinski agreed, calling her "a machine". Hamilton said that watching Tennell was "comforting" because of her consistency, and that the injuries she suffered during the 2015–2016 and the 2016–2017 seasons challenged her to become a better skater. Tennell told reporters, "I've never been a nervous competitor." She also said that she enjoyed the challenge of jumps and performing and using the energy of her audience during competition, although Helene Elliott of the Los Angeles Times, who called Tennell's jumps and spins "flawless", stated that Tennell's "consistency and technical expertise have been her greatest assets ... [but] she lacked the expressiveness that elevates great skaters above good ones".

During the 2020–2021 season, Tennell has made it a point of emphasis to try to add the triple Axel to her program, which several of her international rivals, such as Tuktemisheva, already have mastered. NBC Sports reported her situation by stating that: "Tennell was increasingly annoyed by her failure to get traction on her goal of adding another spin to one jump, the Axel. She wanted to master the triple Axel ..."

Programs

Competitive highlights
GP: Grand Prix; CS: Challenger Series; JGP: Junior Grand Prix

2013–2014 to present

2009–2010 to 2012–2013

Detailed results

Senior level 

Small medals for short and free programs awarded only at ISU Championships.

Junior level

 ISU personal bests highlighted in bold.

References

External links

1998 births
Living people
American female single skaters
Figure skaters at the 2018 Winter Olympics
Olympic bronze medalists for the United States in figure skating
Medalists at the 2018 Winter Olympics
People from Winfield, Illinois
People from Carpentersville, Illinois
Sportspeople from Illinois
Four Continents Figure Skating Championships medalists
21st-century American women